Nampo Station (a.k.a. Nampodong Station) is a station of Busan Metro Line 1 in Nampo-dong, Jung District, Busan, South Korea.

External links
 Cyber station information from Busan Transportation Corporation

Busan Metro stations
Jung District, Busan
Railway stations opened in 1988
1988 establishments in South Korea